The Internazionali di Tennis del Friuli Venezia Giulia (previously known as the Zucchetti Kos Tennis Cup and Credit Agricole Friuladria Tennis Cup) is a tennis tournament played on outdoor red clay courts. It is currently part of the Association of Tennis Professionals (ATP) Challenger Tour and the ITF Women's Circuit. It is held annually at the A.S.D. Eurotennis Club in Cordenons, Italy, since 2004.

Past finals

Men's singles

Women's singles

Men's doubles

Women's doubles

External links
Official website
ITF Search 

 
ATP Challenger Tour
ITF Women's World Tennis Tour
Clay court tennis tournaments
Tennis tournaments in Italy
Recurring sporting events established in 2004